Luis Sáinz Hinojosa (21 June 1936 – 8 October 2022) was a Bolivian prelate of the Catholic Church.

Luis Sáinz Hinojosa was born on 21 June 1936 in Tiquipaya, Bolivia. He joined the Franciscans on 17 January 1961 and was ordained a priest on 26 August 1962.

On 8 May 1982, Pope John Paul II appointed him auxiliary bishop of Cochabamba and titular bishop of Thucca Terebenthina. He received his episcopal consecration on 31 July 1982 from the  Apostolic Nuncio in Bolivia, Alfio Rapisarda, with Gennaro Maria Prata Vuolo, Archbishop of Cochabamba, and Luis Aníbal Rodríguez Pardo, Archbishop of Santa Cruz de la Sierra as co-consecrators.

On 24 February 1987, he was appointed Archbishop of La Paz and was installed there on 19 April. He resigned from that office on 1 August 1996 and then continued pastoral work, first in a village and then in Quillacollo.

On 12 September 2001 he was appointed auxiliary bishop of Cochabamba and titular archbishop of Iunca in Mauretania.

Pope Benedict XVI accepted his resignation for reasons of age on 29 August 2012.

References

External links
 Luis Sáinz Hinojosa at Catholic Hierarchy

1936 births
2022 deaths
Bolivian Roman Catholic archbishops
Bolivian Friars Minor
Franciscan bishops
People from Quillacollo Province
Roman Catholic bishops of Cochabamba
Roman Catholic archbishops of La Paz
Bishops appointed by Pope John Paul II